Geesaley, also known as Gesulli, is a coastal town in the northeastern Bari province of Somalia. It is situated in the autonomous Puntland region.

Location
It lies 4 nautical miles (4.6 miles) northeast of Murcanyo and 2.6 nautical miles (3 miles) southwest of Habo.

Geography
The town is situated on a low plain surrounded by the Jebel Murcanyo mountain range and an elongated bay that lies in the Gulf of Aden. ' meaning mountain in Arabic), the mountain range stretches across the Bari region to the Indian Ocean coastline at Bargal. It consists of cream-coloured limestone, as well as sandstone, shale and quartz.

Administration
On April 8, 2013, the Puntland government announced the creation of a new region coextensive with Geesaley and Cape Guardafui, named Gardafuul. Carved out of the Bari region, it consists of three districts and has its capital at Alula.

Education
According to the Puntland Ministry of Education, there is 1 primary school in Geesaley.

See also
Maritime history of Somalia
Geography of Somalia

References

Bari, Somalia
Headlands of Somalia